Carex parva, also known to Chinese people as xiao tai cao, is a tussock-forming species of perennial sedge in the family Cyperaceae. It is native to parts of Asia from Afghanistan  to Mongolia.

The species was described by the botanist Christian Gottfried Daniel Nees von Esenbeck in 1834 as published in Contributions to the Botany of India. The type specimen was collected in a boggy meadow in the Kishenganga Valley leading to Nanga Parbat in Kashmir. There are three synonyms; Carex macrorhyncha, Carex unifoliata and Kobresia lolonum.

The range of the plant extends from Kazakhstan, Uzbekistan and Turkmenistan in the west to the coast of China in the east. It is found from Kazakhstan and Mongolia in the north to Pakistan in the south. It is found throughout the Himilayas.

See also
List of Carex species

References

parva
Plants described in 1834
Taxa named by Christian Gottfried Daniel Nees von Esenbeck
Flora of Afghanistan
Flora of Mongolia
Flora of Kazakhstan
Flora of Kyrgyzstan
Flora of China
Flora of Pakistan
Flora of Nepal
Flora of Tibet
Flora of Tajikistan
Flora of Uzbekistan
Flora of Turkmenistan